H-E Double Hockey Sticks is a 1999 American made-for-television comedy film directed by Randall Miller starring Will Friedle and Matthew Lawrence. The film is based on the opera Griffelkin by Lukas Foss. The film's title is a common euphemism for the word hell. The film premiered on October 3, 1999, as a part of The Wonderful World of Disney anthology series on ABC.

Plot summary
Satan, in the form of Ms. Beelzebub (Rhea Perlman), sends apprentice demon Griffelkin (Friedle) to Earth's surface to steal the soul of a hotshot young hockey player named Dave Heinrich (Lawrence), who aspires to be the youngest man to ever win the Stanley Cup.

Dave and Griffelkin reach a very specifically worded agreement whereby Dave's soul is forfeit in exchange for a Stanley Cup championship for the Delaware Demons (a thinly veiled version of the New Jersey Devils), which is Dave's team at the time. After the deal is done, however, Griffelkin also arranges for Dave to be traded to The Annapolis Angels, the last-place team in the league, allowing Griffelkin to fulfill his end of the bargain without actually allowing Dave to win the Stanley Cup himself. He later chooses to help Dave as revenge against Ms Beelzebub for her mean collapsible chair trick and because of his reformation, choosing to side with Good. An Angel named Gabrielle tells Griffelkin that Dave's soul can be saved if the Angels win the Stanley Cup. Dave then realizes that the only way to save his soul is to become a true team player and help his new teammates improve enough to defeat the Demons in the Stanley Cup finals. The Demons lose the Stanley Cup, The Angels win and the deal is off. Griffelkin decides to join Gabrielle, giving up his position as a demon to become an angel who tells him he has a few things he must do to earn his wings. Then Satan/Ms Beelzebub, enraged at her defeat and at Griffelkin for helping Dave win, madly goes back to Hell in a fit of rage.

Main cast

 Will Friedle as Griffelkin
 Matthew Lawrence as Dave Heinrich
 Gabrielle Union as Gabrielle/Gabby
 Rhea Perlman as Satan/Ms. Beelzebub (Ms. B)
 Shawn Pyfrom as Lewis
 Tara Spencer-Nairn as Anne
 Kim Greist as Marie Antoinette
 Brad Nessler as himself
 Kevin McNulty as Annapolis Angels Coach
 Colin Murdock as Delaware Demons Announcer
 Tyler Labine as Mark
 Kett Turton as Skid

External links
 
 

1990s sports comedy films
American ice hockey films
Films based on operas
Films shot in Vancouver
Films directed by Randall Miller
1999 television films
1999 films
Disney television films
1990s American films
ABC network original films